India Knight  (née Gisèle Aertsens; born 14 December 1965) is a British journalist and author. She writes for British newspapers, and has written the books: My Life on a Plate, Don't You Want Me?, The Shops, Neris and India's Idiot-Proof Diet and The Thrift Book (2008). Her novels have been translated into 28 languages.

Background 
She was born to Sabiha Rumani Malik (1948) (of a family related to Maulana Abul Kalam Azad, one of the leaders of the Indian independence movement and a scholar and poet) and Michel Robert Georges Aertsens (1927–2002), the son of First World War hero Gaston Aertsens and Marie-Louise Lacroix, of the family of Belgian statesman Henri Jaspar. At the time of India's birth Malik was 17 years old while Aertsens was 20 years Malik's senior. India's parents separated soon after her birth; India went on to live in Brussels with her mother who, whilst continuing her studies, worked as a translator to support her daughter and herself.

India's mother married Andrew Knight, editor of The Economist, in 1975; at the age of 9, India moved to London to live with her mother and stepfather. At 13, she changed her name by deed poll to India Knight, choosing the name to reflect her mother's Asian heritage alongside her stepfather's surname.
Her mother and stepfather were married for 17 years and had two daughters, Amaryllis and Afsaneh. They were divorced in 1991, and soon after, India's mother married  a family friend, architect Norman Foster; they remained married until 1995. In her semi-autobiographical novel Comfort and Joy, Knight writes about her family and her mother.

Personal life
Knight lives in Suffolk with her partner and daughter. Her first marriage was to Jeremy Langmead, former editor of Wallpaper* magazine and Esquire magazine. The couple have two sons. When they divorced, they lived in houses a few doors apart in Primrose Hill; he subsequently left London for Youngsbury House in Hertfordshire.

Her third child's father is author Andrew O'Hagan. 

In December 2015 she announced her forthcoming marriage to former MP Eric Joyce, her boyfriend of six years.. On 6 November 2018, Joyce was arrested and charged with downloading child abuse images. He was found guilty and handed a suspended sentence in August 2020.

Political views
In August 2014, Knight was one of 200 public figures who were signatories to a letter to The Guardian opposing Scottish independence in the run-up to September's referendum on that issue.

Books

Fiction
 My Life on a Plate (2000)
 Don't You Want Me? (2002)
 Comfort and Joy (2010)
 Mutton (2012)
 Darling (2022) - an updating of The Pursuit of Love by Nancy Mitford

Non-fiction
 The Shops (2003)
 The Dirty Bits For Girls (editor, 2006)
 Neris and India's Idiot-Proof Diet (2007)
 Neris and India's Idiot-Proof Diet Cookbook (2008)
 The Thrift Book: Live Well and Spend Less (2008)

Children's books
 The Baby (2007)

References

External links
 India Knight's column in The Sunday Times
 India Knight's Twitter feed

1965 births
Alumni of Trinity College, Cambridge
British journalists
British bloggers
Living people
Journalists from Brussels
The Sunday Times people
People educated at Wycombe Abbey
People educated at Lycée Français Charles de Gaulle
British columnists